Cunninghame South may refer to:

 Cunninghame South (UK Parliament constituency)
 Cunninghame South (Scottish Parliament constituency)